{{Infobox film
| name           = Phir Ussi Mod Par
| image          = 
| caption        = Theatrical release poster
| director       = Lekh Tandon
| producer       = KMPL production. Kanika, Anshula and Trinetra Bajpai.
| writer         = Story:Pt. Revati Sharan SharmaScreenplay & Dialogues:Lekh Tandon
| starring       = Nadira Zaheer BabbarKanwaljitParmeet SethiKanika BajpaiRajeev VermaGovind NaamdevSmita Jaykar
| music          = Shankar JaikishanTrinetra BajpaiAgnelFaizan
| cinematography = Jahangir Chaudhary
| editing        = Awadh Narayan Singh
| studio         = Kanika Multiscope Pvt Ltd
| released       = 
| runtime        = 134 minutes
| country        = India
| language       = Hindi
}} Phir Ussi Mod Par ' (English: Back to Square One'') is a Hindi movie directed by Lekh Tandon and was produced under the banner of Avant-garde motion picture.

It is a contemporary film on a hotly debated topical subject, and a relevant the issue of “Triple Talaq” i.e., a tradition of divorce in Islam that happens when one verbally speaks mere three words. The  issue is featured in social and media circles regularly - a tidal wave of public opinion which refuses to ebb.  The treatment of the controversial subject silhouettes the futility and unsavory repercussions of the prevalent practice of Talaq against the socio-religious relevance of the practice juxtaposed with the real-time honored beliefs and modern way of life. The film endeavors to convey the practicality of being associated with the basic modus operandi of the practice of “Triple Talaq,” which, although present in abundance in religious under-currents is selfishly camouflaged and purposely misinterpreted to meet personal ends with the ethos of the very basis of the denouement taking a back seat in the process.

The movie had its world premiere at the Berlin Film Festival 2018, opening to a packed house with a rousing response. It is produced by Trinetra, Kanika, and Anshula Bajpai under their banner Kanika Multiscope (KMPL).

Plot 
A pregnant Naaz (Jividha Sharma) who is given triple talaq by her husband Shaheed (Parmeet Sethi) could not take the shock and tries to kill herself. She is saved by Rasheed (Kanwaljeet Singh), who marries her and gives her a new lease on life. However, when later in life, she comes across a triple talaq situation, she chooses to fight it rather than let it go.

Cast
Kanika Bajpai as Ruby Beghum
Nadira Zaheer Babbar as Anchor
Kanwaljit Singh as Rashid
Govind Namdev as Zahid Khan
Parmeet Sethi as Shahid Khan
Jividha Sharma as Naaz
Shikha Iktaan as Shabnam
S. M. Zaheer as MunshiJi
Smita Jaykar as Beghum
Vineeta Malik as Ammi
Rajeev Verma as ADV. Usman Shaikh
Haider Ali as Sufi
Sanjay Sharma as Maulvi
Brij Bhooshan Sahani as ADV. Pandit

Release
The world premiere was held at Kino3, Zoopalast theatre of the Berlin Film Festival.

References

External links
  at Cinestaan

2010s Hindi-language films
Indian drama films
Films directed by Lekh Tandon